In genetics, dominance is the phenomenon of one variant (allele) of a gene on a chromosome masking or overriding the effect of a different variant of the same gene on the other copy of the chromosome. The first variant is termed dominant and the second recessive. This state of having two different variants of the same gene on each chromosome is originally caused by a mutation in one of the genes, either new (de novo) or inherited. The terms autosomal dominant or autosomal recessive are used to describe gene variants on non-sex chromosomes (autosomes) and their associated traits, while those on sex chromosomes (allosomes) are termed X-linked dominant, X-linked recessive or Y-linked; these have an inheritance and presentation pattern that depends on the sex of both the parent and the child (see Sex linkage). Since there is only one copy of the Y chromosome, Y-linked traits cannot be dominant or recessive. Additionally, there are other forms of dominance such as incomplete dominance, in which a gene variant has a partial effect compared to when it is present on both chromosomes, and co-dominance, in which different variants on each chromosome both show their associated traits.

Dominance is a key concept in Mendelian inheritance and classical genetics. Letters and Punnett squares are used to demonstrate the principles of dominance in teaching, and the use of upper case letters for dominant alleles and lower case letters for recessive alleles is a widely followed convention. A classic example of dominance is the inheritance of seed shape in peas. Peas may be round, associated with allele R, or wrinkled, associated with allele r. In this case, three combinations of alleles (genotypes) are possible: RR, Rr, and rr. The RR (homozygous) individuals have round peas, and the rr (homozygous) individuals have wrinkled peas. In Rr (heterozygous) individuals, the R allele masks the presence of the r allele, so these individuals also have round peas. Thus, allele R is dominant over allele r, and allele r is recessive to allele R.

Dominance is not inherent to an allele or its traits (phenotype). It is a strictly relative effect between two alleles of a given gene of any function; one allele can be dominant over a second allele of the same gene, recessive to a third and co-dominant with a fourth. Additionally, one allele may be dominant for one trait but not others.

Dominance differs from epistasis, the phenomenon of an allele of one gene masking the effect of alleles of a different gene.

Background

The concept of dominance was introduced by Gregor Johann Mendel. Though Mendel, "The Father of Genetics", first used the term in the 1860s, it was not widely known until the early twentieth century. Mendel observed that, for a variety of traits of garden peas having to do with the appearance of seeds, seed pods, and plants, there were two discrete phenotypes, such as round versus wrinkled seeds, yellow versus green seeds, red versus white flowers or tall versus short plants. When bred separately, the plants always produced the same phenotypes, generation after generation. However, when lines with different phenotypes were crossed (interbred), one and only one of the parental phenotypes showed up in the offspring (green, or round, or red, or tall). However, when these hybrid plants were crossed, the offspring plants showed the two original phenotypes, in a characteristic 3:1 ratio, the more common phenotype being that of the parental hybrid plants. Mendel reasoned that each parent in the first cross was a homozygote for different alleles (one parent AA and the other parent aa), that each contributed one allele to the offspring, with the result that all of these hybrids were heterozygotes (Aa), and that one of the two alleles in the hybrid cross dominated expression of the other: A masked a. The final cross between two heterozygotes (Aa X Aa) would produce AA, Aa, and aa offspring in a 1:2:1 genotype ratio with the first two classes showing the (A) phenotype, and the last showing the (a) phenotype, thereby producing the 3:1 phenotype ratio.

Mendel did not use the terms gene, allele, phenotype, genotype, homozygote, and heterozygote, all of which were introduced later. He did introduce the notation of capital and lowercase letters for dominant and recessive alleles, respectively, still in use today.

In 1928, British population geneticist Ronald Fisher proposed that dominance acted based on natural selection through the contribution of modifier genes. In 1929, American geneticist Sewall Wright responded by stating that dominance is simply a physiological consequence of metabolic pathways and the relative necessity of the gene involved. Wright's explanation became a fact in genetics, and the debate was largely ended. Some traits may have their dominance influenced by evolutionary mechanisms, however.

Chromosomes, genes, and alleles

Most animals and some plants have paired chromosomes, and are described as diploid. They have two versions of each chromosome, one contributed by the mother's ovum, and the other by the father's sperm, known as gametes, described as haploid, and created through meiosis. These gametes then fuse during fertilization during sexual reproduction, into a new single cell zygote, which divides multiple times, resulting in a new organism with the same number of pairs of chromosomes in each (non-gamete) cell as its parents. In mammalian genetics, autosomal dominant disorders have pedigrees that demonstrate a vertical pattern of inheritance.

Each chromosome of a matching (homologous) pair is structurally similar to the other, and has a very similar DNA sequence (loci, singular locus). The DNA in each chromosome functions as a series of discrete genes that influence various traits. Thus, each gene also has a corresponding homologue, which may exist in different versions called alleles. The alleles at the same locus on the two homologous chromosomes may be identical or different.

For example, the blood type of humans is determined by the ABO gene which encodes variants of an enzyme that creates the A, B, AB, or O blood type located on the long or q arm of chromosome nine (9q34.2). There are three different alleles that could be present at this locus, but only two can be present in any individual, one inherited from their mother and one from their father.

If two alleles of a given gene are identical, the organism is called a homozygote and is said to be homozygous with respect to that gene; if instead the two alleles are different, the organism is a heterozygote and is heterozygous. The genetic makeup of an organism, either at a single locus or over all its genes collectively, is called its genotype. The genotype of an organism, directly and indirectly, affects its molecular, physical, and other traits, which individually or collectively are called its phenotype. At heterozygous gene loci, the two alleles interact to produce the phenotype.

Types of Dominance

Complete dominance
In complete dominance, the effect of one allele in a heterozygous genotype completely masks the effect of the other. The allele that masks is considered dominant to the other allele, and the masked allele is considered recessive.

Complete dominance in a heterozygote's phenotype is indistinguishable from a dominant homozygote's phenotype.

A classic example of complete dominance is the inheritance of seed shape (pea shape) in peas. Peas may be round (associated with allele R) or wrinkled (associated with allele r). In this case, three combinations of alleles (genotypes) are possible: RR, rr, Rr. RR and rr are homozygous, and Rr is heterozygous. The RR individuals have round peas and the rr individuals have wrinkled peas. In Rr individuals, the R allele masks the presence of the r allele, so these individuals also have round peas. Thus, allele R is completely dominant to allele r, and allele r is recessive to allele R.

Incomplete dominance

Incomplete dominance (also called partial dominance, semi-dominance, intermediate inheritance, or occasionally incorrectly co-dominance in reptile genetics) occurs when the phenotype of the heterozygous genotype is distinct from and often intermediate to the phenotypes of the homozygous genotypes. The phenotypic result often appears as a blended form of characteristics in heterozygous state. For example, the snapdragon flower color is homozygous for either red or white. When the red homozygous flower is paired with the white homozygous flower, the result yields a pink snapdragon flower. The pink snapdragon is the result of incomplete dominance. A similar type of incomplete dominance is found in the four o'clock plant wherein pink color is produced when true-bred parents of white and red flowers are crossed. In quantitative genetics, where phenotypes are measured and treated numerically, if a heterozygote's phenotype is exactly between (numerically) that of the two homozygotes, the phenotype is said to exhibit no dominance at all, i.e. dominance exists only when the heterozygote's phenotype measure lies closer to one homozygote than the other.

When plants of the F1 generation are self-pollinated, the phenotypic and genotypic ratio of the F2 generation will be 1:2:1 (Red:Pink:White).

Co-dominance

Co-dominance occurs when the contributions of both alleles are visible in the phenotype and neither allele masks another.

For example, in the ABO blood group system, chemical modifications to a glycoprotein (the H antigen) on the surfaces of blood cells are controlled by three alleles, two of which are co-dominant to each other (IA, IB) and dominant over the recessive i at the ABO locus. The IA and IB alleles produce different modifications. The enzyme coded for by IA adds an N-acetylgalactosamine to a membrane-bound H antigen. The IB enzyme adds a galactose. The i allele produces no modification. Thus the IA and IB alleles are each dominant to i (IAIA and IAi individuals both have type A blood, and IBIB and IBi individuals both have type B blood), but IAIB individuals have both modifications on their blood cells and thus have type AB blood, so the IA and IB alleles are said to be co-dominant.

Another example occurs at the locus for the beta-globin component of hemoglobin, where the three molecular phenotypes of HbA/HbA, HbA/HbS, and HbS/HbS are all distinguishable by protein electrophoresis. (The medical condition produced by the heterozygous genotype is called sickle-cell trait and is a milder condition distinguishable from sickle-cell anemia, thus the alleles show incomplete dominance with respect to anemia, see above). For most gene loci at the molecular level, both alleles are expressed co-dominantly, because both are transcribed into RNA.

Co-dominance, where allelic products co-exist in the phenotype, is different from incomplete dominance, where the quantitative interaction of allele products produces an intermediate phenotype. For example, in co-dominance, a red homozygous flower and a white homozygous flower will produce offspring that have red and white spots. When plants of the F1 generation are self-pollinated, the phenotypic and genotypic ratio of the F2 generation will be 1:2:1 (Red:Spotted:White). These ratios are the same as those for incomplete dominance. Again, this classical terminology is inappropriate – in reality such cases should not be said to exhibit dominance at all.

Addressing common misconceptions

Dominance describes the relationship between alleles of a gene. A dominant trait is usually in correspondence to inheritance patterns that can be seen in Punnett Squares. If an individual has two versions of a gene, then the allele corresponding to the phenotype that presents in heterozygotes (assuming complete dominance) is considered "dominant".

There are common misconceptions related to dominance. Some common misconceptions include the moralization of dominant alleles as being “stronger” or “masculine” compared to a “passive” or “feminine” recessive allele. These misconceptions are based on concepts of dominance in non-genetic settings; such as being strong, powerful and controlling; which differs from the genetic concept of dominance. 

Dominance does not determine whether an allele is deleterious, neutral, or advantageous. However, selection must operate on genes indirectly through phenotypes. Because dominance affects the exposure of alleles in phenotypes, it affects the rate of change in allele frequencies under selection. Deleterious recessive alleles may persist in a population at low frequencies, with most copies carried in heterozygotes, at no cost to those individuals. These rare recessives are the basis for many hereditary genetic disorders.

Nomenclature

In genetics, symbols began as algebraic placeholders. When one allele is dominant to another, the oldest convention is to symbolize the dominant allele with a capital letter. The recessive allele is assigned the same letter in lower case. In the pea example, once the dominance relationship between the two alleles is known, it is possible to designate the dominant allele that produces a round shape by a capital-letter symbol R, and the recessive allele that produces a wrinkled shape by a lower-case symbol r. The homozygous dominant, heterozygous, and homozygous recessive genotypes are then written RR, Rr, and rr, respectively. It would also be possible to designate the two alleles as W and w, and the three genotypes WW, Ww, and ww, the first two of which produced round peas and the third wrinkled peas. The choice of "R" or "W" as the symbol for the dominant allele does not pre-judge whether the allele causing the "round" or "wrinkled" phenotype when homozygous is the dominant one.

A gene may have several alleles. Each allele is symbolized by the locus symbol followed by a unique superscript. In many species, the most common allele in the wild population is designated the wild type allele. It is symbolized with a + character as a superscript. Other alleles are dominant or recessive to the wild type allele. For recessive alleles, the locus symbol is in lower case letters. For alleles with any degree of dominance to the wild type allele, the first letter of the locus symbol is in upper case. For example, here are some of the alleles at the a locus of the laboratory mouse, Mus musculus: Ay, dominant yellow; a+, wild type; and abt, black and tan. The abt allele is recessive to the wild type allele, and the Ay allele is codominant to the wild type allele. The Ay allele is also codominant to the abt allele, but showing that relationship is beyond the limits of the rules for mouse genetic nomenclature.

Rules of genetic nomenclature have evolved as genetics has become more complex. Committees have standardized the rules for some species, but not for all. Rules for one species may differ somewhat from the rules for a different species.

Relationship to other genetic concepts

Multiple alleles

Although any individual of a diploid organism has at most two different alleles at any one locus (barring aneuploidies), most genes exist in a large number of allelic versions in the population as a whole. If the alleles have different effects on the phenotype, sometimes their dominance relationships can be described as a series.

For example, coat color in domestic cats is affected by a series of alleles of the TYR gene (which encodes the enzyme tyrosinase). The alleles C, cb, cs, and ca (full colour, Burmese, Siamese, and albino, respectively) produce different levels of pigment and hence different levels of colour dilution. The C allele (full colour) is completely dominant over the last three and the ca allele (albino) is completely recessive to the first three.

Autosomal versus sex-linked dominance

In humans and other mammal species, sex is determined by two sex chromosomes called the X chromosome and the Y chromosome. Human females are XX; males are XY. The remaining pairs of chromosome are found in both sexes and are called autosomes; genetic traits associated with loci on these chromosomes are described as autosomal, and may be dominant or recessive. Genetic traits on the X and Y chromosomes are called sex-linked, because they are linked to sex chromosomes, not because they are characteristic of one sex or the other. In practice, the term almost always refers to X-linked traits and a great many such traits (such as red-green colour vision deficiency) are not affected by sex. Females have two copies of every gene locus found on the X chromosome, just as for the autosomes, and the same dominance relationships apply. Males, however, have only one copy of each X chromosome gene locus, and are described as hemizygous for these genes. The Y chromosome is much smaller than the X, and contains a much smaller set of genes, including, but not limited to, those that influence 'maleness', such as the SRY gene for testis determining factor. Dominance rules for sex-linked gene loci are determined by their behavior in the female: because the male has only one allele (except in the case of certain types of Y chromosome aneuploidy), that allele is always expressed regardless of whether it is dominant or recessive. Birds have opposite sex chromosomes: male birds have ZZ and female birds ZW chromosomes. However, inheritance of traits reminds XY-system otherwise; male zebra finches may carry white colouring gene in their one of two Z chromosome, but females develop white colouring always. Grasshoppers have XO-system. Females have XX, but males only X. There is no Y chromosome at all.

Epistasis

Epistasis ["epi + stasis = to sit on top"] is an interaction between alleles at two different gene loci that affect a single trait, which may sometimes resemble a dominance interaction between two different alleles at the same locus. Epistasis modifies the characteristic 9:3:3:1 ratio expected for two non-epistatic genes. For two loci, 14 classes of epistatic interactions are recognized. As an example of recessive epistasis, one gene locus may determine whether a flower pigment is yellow (AA or Aa) or green (aa), while another locus determines whether the pigment is produced (BB or Bb) or not (bb). In a bb plant, the flowers will be white, irrespective of the genotype of the other locus as AA, Aa, or aa. The bb combination is not dominant to the A allele: rather, the B gene shows recessive epistasis to the A gene, because the B locus when homozygous for the recessive allele (bb) suppresses phenotypic expression of the A locus. In a cross between two AaBb plants, this produces a characteristic 9:3:4 ratio, in this case of yellow : green : white flowers.

In dominant epistasis, one gene locus may determine yellow or green pigment as in the previous example: AA and Aa are yellow, and aa are green. A second locus determines whether a pigment precursor is produced (dd) or not (DD or Dd). Here, in a DD or Dd plant, the flowers will be colorless irrespective of the genotype at the A locus, because of the epistatic effect of the dominant D allele. Thus, in a cross between two AaDd plants, 3/4 of the plants will be colorless, and the yellow and green phenotypes are expressed only in dd plants. This produces a characteristic 12:3:1 ratio of white : yellow : green plants.

Supplementary epistasis occurs when two loci affect the same phenotype. For example, if pigment color is produced by CC or Cc but not cc, and by DD or Dd but not dd, then pigment is not produced in any genotypic combination with either cc or dd. That is, both loci must have at least one dominant allele to produce the phenotype. This produces a characteristic 9:7 ratio of pigmented to unpigmented plants. Complementary epistasis in contrast produces an unpigmented plant if and only if the genotype is cc and dd, and the characteristic ratio is 15:1 between pigmented and unpigmented plants.

Classical genetics considered epistatic interactions between two genes at a time. It is now evident from molecular genetics that all gene loci are involved in complex interactions with many other genes (e.g., metabolic pathways may involve scores of genes), and that this creates epistatic interactions that are much more complex than the classic two-locus models.

Hardy–Weinberg principle (estimation of carrier frequency)

The frequency of the heterozygous state (which is the carrier state for a recessive trait) can be estimated using the Hardy–Weinberg formula: 

This formula applies to a gene with exactly two alleles and relates the frequencies of those alleles in a large population to the frequencies of their three genotypes in that population.

For example, if p is the frequency of allele A, and q is the frequency of allele a then the terms p2, 2pq, and q2 are the frequencies of the genotypes AA, Aa and aa respectively.

This formula relies on a number of assumptions and an accurate estimate of the frequency of the recessive trait. In general, any real-world situation will deviate from these assumptions to some degree, introducing corresponding inaccuracies into the estimate. If the recessive trait is rare, then it will be hard to estimate its frequency accurately, as a very large sample size will be needed.

Dominant versus advantageous

The property of "dominant" is sometimes confused with the concept of advantageous and the property of "recessive" is sometimes confused with the concept of deleterious, but the phenomena are distinct. Dominance describes the phenotype of heterozygotes with regard to the phenotypes of the homozygotes and without respect to the degree to which different phenotypes may be beneficial or deleterious. Since many genetic disease alleles are recessive and because the word dominance has a positive connotation, the assumption that the dominant phenotype is superior with respect to fitness is often made. This is not assured however; as discussed below while most genetic disease alleles are deleterious and recessive, not all genetic diseases are recessive.

Nevertheless, this confusion has been pervasive throughout the history of genetics and persists to this day. Addressing this confusion was one of the prime motivations for the publication of the Hardy–Weinberg principle.

Molecular mechanisms
The molecular basis of dominance was unknown to Mendel. It is now understood that a gene locus includes a long series (hundreds to thousands) of bases or nucleotides of deoxyribonucleic acid (DNA) at a particular point on a chromosome. The central dogma of molecular biology states that "DNA makes RNA makes protein", that is, that DNA is transcribed to make an RNA copy, and RNA is translated to make a protein. In this process, different alleles at a locus may or may not be transcribed, and if transcribed may be translated to slightly different versions of the same protein (called isoforms). Proteins often function as enzymes that catalyze chemical reactions in the cell, which directly or indirectly produce phenotypes. Mutations within the genome can alter catalytic activity, and therefore affect dominance. In any diploid organism, the DNA sequences of the two alleles present at any gene locus may be identical (homozygous) or different (heterozygous). Even if the gene locus is heterozygous at the level of the DNA sequence, the proteins made by each allele may be identical. In the absence of any difference between the protein products, neither allele can be said to be dominant (see co-dominance, above). Even if the two protein products are slightly different (allozymes), it is likely that they produce the same phenotype with respect to enzyme action, and again neither allele can be said to be dominant.

Zygosity 
Historically, Mendel's Law of Independent Assortment assumed that alleles will sort independently, with one allele being "dominant". Zygosity, degree of similarity of an organism's alleles, may affect dominance. Within a diploid organism, these would be defined by the Haplotype interactions of the alleles. Gene haploidy may result in a single, functional allele making sufficient protein to produce a phenotype identical to that of the homozygote. Three general types of haplotype interactions are possible:

 Haplosufficiency. In a diploid, a functional allele of a haplosufficient gene would be considered dominant, while a non-functional allele would be considered recessive. For example, suppose the standard amount of enzyme produced in the functional homozygote is 100%, with the two functional alleles contributing 50% each. The single functional allele in the heterozygote produces 50% of the standard amount of enzyme, which is sufficient to produce the standard phenotype. If the heterozygote and the functional-allele homozygote have identical phenotypes, the functional allele is dominant to the non-functional allele. This occurs at the albino gene locus: the heterozygote produces sufficient enzyme to convert the pigment precursor to melanin, and the individual has standard pigmentation.  For example, in humans and other organisms, the unpigmented skin of the albino phenotype results when an individual is homozygous for an allele that encodes a non-functional version of an enzyme needed to produce the skin pigment melanin.
 Incomplete Haploinsufficiency. Less commonly, the presence of a single functional allele gives a phenotype that is not normal, but less severe, than that of the non-functional homozygote. This occurs when the functional allele is not haplo-sufficient thus the terms haplo-insufficiency and incomplete dominance are typically applied to these cases. The intermediate interaction occurs where the heterozygous genotype produces a phenotype intermediate between the two homozygotes. Depending on which of the two homozygotes the heterozygote most resembles, one allele is said to show incomplete dominance over the other. For example, in humans the Hb gene locus is responsible for the Beta-chain protein (HBB) that is one of the two globin proteins that make up the blood pigment hemoglobin. Many people are homozygous for an allele called HbA; some persons carry an alternative allele called HbS, either as homozygotes or heterozygotes. The hemoglobin molecules of HbS/HbS homozygotes undergo a change in shape that distorts the morphology of the red blood cells, and causes a severe, life-threatening form of anemia called sickle-cell anemia. Persons heterozygous HbA/HbS for this allele have a much less severe form of anemia called sickle-cell trait. Because the disease phenotype of HbA/HbS heterozygotes is more similar to but not identical to the HbA/HbA homozygote, the HbA allele is said to be incompletely dominant to the HbS allele.
 Complete Haploinsufficiency. A single functional allele in the heterozygote may produce insufficient gene product for any function of the gene, causing the usually non-functional alleles to become dominant. The phenotype will then resemble that of a homozygote with non-functional allele instead of the wild type. The non-functional allele would be said to be dominant to the wild-type phenotype's functional allele. This situation may occur when the non-functional allele produces a defective protein that interferes with the proper function of the protein produced by the standard allele. The presence of the defective protein "dominates" the standard protein, and the disease phenotype of the heterozygote more closely resembles that of the homozygote for two defective alleles. The term "dominant" is often incorrectly applied to defective alleles whose homozygous phenotype has not been examined, but which cause a distinct phenotype when heterozygous with the normal allele. This phenomenon occurs in a number of trinucleotide repeat diseases, one example being Huntington's disease.  In Huntington's Disease, complete haploinsufficiency causes the dominant effect of the mutant protein. Normally, a person has about 20 C-A-G nucleotide repeats in their HTT gene, but those with Huntington Disease have 40+ C-A-G repeats. Another example is Marfan syndrome, an inherited connective tissue disorder, caused by a mutation in the fibrillin-1 (FBN1) gene. One normal copy of the FBN1 gene is inherited from one parent while a dominant abnormal FBN1 gene copy in inherited by another parent.

Dominant-negative mutations
Many proteins are normally active in the form of a multimer, an aggregate of multiple copies of the same protein, otherwise known as a homomultimeric protein or homooligomeric protein. In fact, a majority of the 83,000 different enzymes from 9800 different organisms in the BRENDA Enzyme Database represent homooligomers. When the wild-type version of the protein is present along with a mutant version, a mixed multimer can be formed. A mutation that leads to a mutant protein that disrupts the activity of the wild-type protein in the multimer is a dominant-negative mutation.

A dominant-negative mutation may arise in a human somatic cell and provide a proliferative advantage to the mutant cell, leading to its clonal expansion. For instance, a dominant-negative mutation in a gene necessary for the normal process of programmed cell death (Apoptosis) in response to DNA damage can make the cell resistant to apoptosis. This will allow proliferation of the clone even when excessive DNA damage is present. Such dominant-negative mutations occur in the tumor suppressor gene p53. The P53 wild-type protein is normally present as a four-protein multimer (oligotetramer). Dominant-negative p53 mutations occur in a number of different types of cancer and pre-cancerous lesions (e.g. brain tumors, breast cancer, oral pre-cancerous lesions and oral cancer).

Dominant-negative mutations also occur in other tumor suppressor genes. For instance two dominant-negative germ line mutations were identified in the Ataxia telangiectasia mutated (ATM) gene which increases susceptibility to breast cancer. Dominant negative mutations of the transcription factor C/EBPα can cause acute myeloid leukemia. Inherited dominant negative mutations can also increase the risk of diseases other than cancer. Dominant-negative mutations in Peroxisome proliferator-activated receptor gamma (PPARγ) are associated with severe insulin resistance, diabetes mellitus and hypertension.

Dominant-negative mutations have also been described in organisms other than humans. In fact, the first study reporting a mutant protein inhibiting the normal function of a wild-type protein in a mixed multimer was with the bacteriophage T4 tail fiber protein GP37. Mutations that produce a truncated protein rather than a full-length mutant protein seem to have the strongest dominant-negative effect in the studies of P53, ATM, C/EBPα, and bacteriophage T4 GP37.

Dominant and recessive genetic diseases in humans
In humans, many genetic traits or diseases are classified simply as "dominant" or "recessive". Especially with so-called recessive diseases, which are indeed a factor of recessive genes, but can oversimplify the underlying molecular basis and lead to misunderstanding of the nature of dominance.

For example, the recessive genetic disease phenylketonuria (PKU) results from any of a large number (>60) of alleles at the gene locus for the enzyme phenylalanine hydroxylase (PAH). Many of these alleles produce little or no PAH, as a result of which the substrate phenylalanine (Phe) and its metabolic byproducts accumulate in the central nervous system and can cause severe intellectual disability if untreated.

To illustrate these nuances, the genotypes and phenotypic consequences of interactions among three hypothetical PAH alleles are shown in the following table:

In unaffected persons homozygous for a standard functional allele (AA), PAH activity is standard (100%), and the concentration of phenylalanine in the blood [Phe] is about 60 μM (= μmol/L). In untreated persons homozygous for one of the PKU alleles (BB), PAH activity is close to zero, [Phe] ten to forty times standard, and the individual manifests PKU.

In the AB heterozygote, PAH activity is only 30% (not 50%) of standard, blood [Phe] is elevated two-fold, and the person does not manifest PKU. Thus, the A allele is dominant to the B allele with respect to PKU, but the B allele is incompletely dominant to the A allele with respect to its molecular effect, determination of PAH activity level (0.3% < 30% << 100%). Finally, the A allele is incompletely dominant to the B allele with respect to [Phe], as 60 μM < 120 μM << 600 μM. Note once more that it is irrelevant to the question of dominance that the recessive allele produces a more extreme [Phe] phenotype.

For a third allele C, a CC homozygote produces a very small amount of PAH enzyme, which results in a somewhat elevated level of [Phe] in the blood, a condition called hyperphenylalaninemia, which does not result in intellectual disability.

That is, the dominance relationships of any two alleles may vary according to which aspect of the phenotype is under consideration. It is typically more useful to talk about the phenotypic consequences of the allelic interactions involved in any genotype, rather than to try to force them into dominant and recessive categories.

See also
 Ambidirectional dominance
 List of Mendelian traits in humans
 Mitochondrial DNA
 Punnett square

References

 "On-line notes for Biology 2250 – Principles of Genetics". Memorial University of Newfoundland.
  — Sickle-Cell Anemia
  — ABO blood groups

External links
 "Online Mendelian Inheritance in Man" (OMIM)
 "Autosomal dominance of Huntington's Disease". Huntington's Disease Outreach Project for Education at Stanford

Classical genetics
Genetics concepts

Quantitative genetics